Paul L. Harris (born April 12, 1953) is an American politician of the Republican Party. He is a member of the Washington House of Representatives, representing the 17th district.

Awards 
 2014 Guardians of Small Business award. Presented by NFIB.
 2020 Guardians of Small Business. Presented by NFIB.

Personal life 
Harris's wife is Lori Harris. They have five children. Harris and his family live in Vancouver, Washington.

References

External links 
 Paul Harris at houserepublicans.wa.gov
 Paul Harris in ballotpedia.org

1953 births
21st-century American politicians
Living people
Republican Party members of the Washington House of Representatives
Politicians from Portland, Oregon
Politicians from Vancouver, Washington